Kuzhenkino is the name of several inhabited localities in Bologovsky District of Tver Oblast, Russia.

Urban localities
Kuzhenkino (urban-type settlement), an urban-type settlement; administratively incorporated as Kuzhenkinskoye Urban Settlement

Rural localities
Kuzhenkino (rural locality), a selo in Kuzhenkinskoye Rural Settlement